Lalengmawia Ralte (born 17 October 2000), commonly known by the nickname Apuia, is an Indian professional footballer who plays as a central midfielder for Indian Super League club Mumbai City and the India national team. 

He is the youngest player to ever captain an Indian Super League club, by doing so for NorthEast United at the age of 20 years and 44 days.

Club career

Youth career 
Lalengmawia started playing football at the tender age of 6. His first big break arrived when he was selected to play in his school team for the U14 Subroto Cup, an international inter-school football tournament that is held annually in New Delhi, India. He spent a couple of years at the Regional Sports Training Centre football academy in Kolasib, Mizoram and trained under HC Zarzoliana.
In January 2016, he went to the trials for the 2017 Under-17 World Cup squad that took place in Mizoram and thus joined the AIFF Elite Academy, in Goa.

Indian Arrows

2017-18 season 
On 29 November 2017, Lalengmawia was selected to play for the Indian Arrows, an All India Football Federation owned team that would consist of India under-20 players to give them playing time. He made his professional debut for the side on 23 February 2018, against his hometown club Aizawl. He started and played the full match as Indian Arrows lost 3–0.

In his debut season, Lalengmawia made three appearances, including one in the 2018 Indian Super Cup for the Arrows.

2018-19 season 
On 13 January 2019, Lalengmawia scored his first goal for the development club against Shillong Lajong, in a dominant 3–0 win. He made some space for himself and pulled the trigger from just inside the box to see the ball nestle into the top corner. He featured in 11 matches of the 2018–19 I-League campaign and also once in the 2019 Indian Super Cup as he played well whenever he was called upon and contributed to the ideas head coach Pinto had in his mind.

NorthEast United

2019-20 season: Debut in the ISL 
On 23 May 2019, Indian Super League club NorthEast United secured the services of Lalengmawia for the 2019–20 season. On 18 December 2019, he made his professional debut for the club in the 9th matchweek of the 2019–20 Indian Super League campaign against Bengaluru, in a 2–0 loss. This started of him being more involved in the starting XI following this match.

The 2019–20 Indian Super League season was yet another one to forget for the Highlanders as they finished second last in the table. Lalengmawia, though, was one of the few bright spots in NorthEast's gloomy season. He controlled the midfield, pulling the strings and managed the game like a seasoned pro. He impressed many with his passing accuracy, creativity and endurance in midfield.

2020-21 season: The breakout season 
On 5 August 2020, NorthEast United extended contracts of 5 Indian players which included Lalengmawia for the upcoming season. On 30 November 2020, he captained NorthEast United for the first time in their 1–1 away draw against Goa, which made him the youngest player to lead a side in the Indian Super League, at an age of 20 years and 44 days.

It was the 2020–21 Indian Super League season in which Lalengmawia had a breakout season with the Highlanders. They finished third in the league stages, qualifying for the playoffs for only the second time in their history.  On 26 February 2021, he finally managed to get his first professional goal for the club in the last game of the league stages against Kerala Blasters, in a 2–0 win.

On 13 March 2021, his wonderful displays in the season won him the Indian Super League Emerging Player of the League. He also won the FPAI Young Player of the Year, on 31 March 2021.

Mumbai City

On 13 August 2021, Apuia joined Mumbai City on a five-year deal for a record transfer fee of INR 2 crores ($280,000). He was part of the team as they finished the season on fifth place and failed to qualify for the playoffs. Ahead of the 2022 AFC Champions League kick-off, the club went to Abu Dhabi for training and defeated Emirati giants Al Ain 2–1 in a friendly match, in which Apuia scored a goal.

On 3 September 2022, Mumbai City officially announced that Apuia went to Belgium for a two-week training stint with First Division B side Lommel.

International career
On 2 March 2021, Lalengmawia got selected for the 35-man probable national squad camp ahead of India national team's friendlies against Oman and UAE. On 25 March 2021, he made his international debut for India against Oman when he came on as half-time substitute for Rowllin Borges, which ended in a 1–1 draw.

During the SAFF Championship held in October 2021, Sunil Chhetri, who was awarded the man of the match in the game against Maldives, handed over the award to Apuia.

Style of play 
Tough in body and mind, relentless, forward-looking and with an inexhaustible engine, that is how most people would describe Lalengmawia. He is a part of a generation of players, who insist on wanting to play with the ball.

His ability to get out of tight situations with smooth footwork and his positioning and confidence on the ball consistently make him stand out in the field. He is also adept in finding pockets of space and he's always demanding the ball, looking to direct play. He has impressed many with his ability to compete against more physical players and extremely intelligent game-reading. He is one of those players who covers every blade of grass on a football pitch.

Personal life 
Lalengmawia was born in Aizawl, Mizoram. His father works as a butcher. His parents had always supported his passion for football and were there for him throughout. In 2015, his parents asked him to skip the trials for the 2017 Under-17 World Cup squad that took place in Mizoram, and rather focus on his Class X board exams. He did appear in the next round of trials held in Mizoram, in January 2016.

His favourite clubs are Barcelona and his hometown club Aizawl. He idolises Argentinian forward Lionel Messi, and current Real Kashmir midfielder Lalrindika Ralte is his favourite Indian player. He also revealed that he chose 45 as his jersey number because of Italian forward Mario Balotelli.

Career statistics

Club

International

Honours 

India
 SAFF Championship: 2021

Individual
 Indian Super League: Hero of the Month (February 2021)
 Indian Super League: ISL Emerging Player of the Season (2020–21)
 FPAI Indian Football awards: Young Player of the Year (2020–21)

References

External links
Lalengmawia Ralte at indiansuperleague.com
Lalengmawia Ralte at All India Football Federation

2000 births
Living people
Indian footballers
India youth international footballers
Association football midfielders
Indian Arrows players
NorthEast United FC players
Indian Super League players
I-League players
People from Aizawl
Footballers from Mizoram
India international footballers
AIFF Elite Academy players